The 2022–23 Portland Pilots men's basketball team represented the University of Portland during the 2022–23 NCAA Division I men's basketball season. The Pilots, led by second-year head coach Shantay Legans, played their home games at the Chiles Center as members of the West Coast Conference.

Previous season 
The Pilots finished the 2021–22 season 19–15, 7–7 in WCC play to finish in sixth place. They defeated San Diego in the second round of the WCC tournament before losing to Santa Clara in the quarterfinals They Pilots received an invitation to the Basketball Classic where they defeated New Orleans before losing to Southern Utah in the quarterfinals.

Offseason

Departures

Incoming transfers

2022 recruiting class

Roster

Schedule and results

|-
!colspan=9 style=| Non-conference regular season

|-
!colspan=9 style=| WCC regular season

|-
!colspan=9 style=| WCC tournament

Source: Schedule

References

Portland
Portland Pilots men's basketball seasons
Portland Pilots men's basketball
Portland Pilots men's basketball
Port
Port